Rhinoncus pericarpius is a species of weevil native to Europe.

References

Curculionidae
Beetles described in 1758
Taxa named by Carl Linnaeus
Beetles of Europe